Survivor is the second season of German version of the reality television series Survivor. The game started airing on VOX on September 16, 2019. It is hosted by Florian Weber. The winner wins €500,000.

Format

The show follows the same general format as the other editions of Survivor. To begin, the players are split into two or three tribes, are taken to a remote isolated location and are forced to live off the land with meagre supplies for a period of several weeks. Frequent physical and mental challenges are used to pit the tribes against each other for rewards, such as food or luxuries, or for immunity, forcing the other tribe to attend Tribal Council, where they must vote one of their tribemates out of the game by secret ballot.

About halfway through the game, the tribes are merged into a single tribe, and challenges are on an individual basis; winning immunity prevents that player from being voted out. Most players that are voted out during this stage become members of the Tribal Council Jury. When only two players remain, the Final Tribal Council is held. The finalists pleads their case to the Jury as to why they should win the game. The jurors then have the opportunity to interrogate the finalists before casting their vote for which finalist should be awarded the title of Sole Survivor and win the grand prize of the €500,000 prize.

Like other editions of the show, the German edition has introduced numerous modifications, or twists, on the core rules to prevent players from over-relying on strategies that succeeded in prior seasons or other editions of the show. These changes have included tribe switches, hidden immunity amulets that players can use to save themselves or another player at Tribal Council from being voted off and voting powers which can be used to influence the result at Tribal Council.

Contestants

Season summary

Voting history

References

External links
 Official Website

Germany
2019 German television seasons